Brandon Carrillo Moreno (born December 7, 1993) is a Mexican professional mixed martial artist. He currently competes in the Flyweight division in the Ultimate Fighting Championship (UFC), where he is the current and two-time UFC Flyweight Champion. A professional since 2011, Moreno also competed for the Legacy Fighting Alliance, where he was the Legacy Fighting Alliance Flyweight Champion. As of March 7, 2023, he is #10 in the UFC men's pound-for-pound rankings.

Background
Moreno was born and raised in Tijuana, Baja California, Mexico, in a modest family with a piñata business. At the age of twelve, he wanted to lose weight so his mother enrolled him in the local Entram Gym where he started training mixed martial arts. Despite earlier intentions to attend law school and become a lawyer, Moreno decided to focus solely on his mixed martial arts career.

Mixed martial arts career

Early career
Moreno made his professional MMA debut in his native Mexico in April 2011. Over the next two years, he amassed a record of 6 wins and 3 losses.

In 2014, Moreno would debut for the World Fighting Federation promotion. He would go undefeated in the promotion at 5–0 and would eventually win the Flyweight championship, which led to him being cast in the Flyweight tournament on the 25th season of The Ultimate Fighter.

The Ultimate Fighter
In July 2016, it was revealed that Moreno was a participant on The Ultimate Fighter: Tournament of Champions. Moreno was selected as a member of Team Benavidez. He faced Alexandre Pantoja in the opening stage and lost the fight via submission.

Ultimate Fighting Championship
In a rare move, Moreno debuted in the UFC while his season of The Ultimate Fighter was still airing.  He faced Louis Smolka at UFC Fight Night: Lineker vs. Dodson on October 1, 2016. Moreno won the fight via submission in the first round. The win also earned Moreno his first Performance of the Night bonus award.

In his second fight for the promotion, Moreno returned to face Ryan Benoit on December 3, 2016, at The Ultimate Fighter: Tournament of Champions Finale. He won the fight via split decision.

Moreno next faced Dustin Ortiz on April 22, 2017, at UFC Fight Night 108. He won the fight by submission in the second round and was awarded a Performance of the Night bonus.

Moreno faced Sergio Pettis on August 5, 2017, at UFC Fight Night 114. He lost the fight via unanimous decision. Moreno subsequently tested positive for clenbuterol from an in-competition urine sample collected on August 6, 2017, a day after his fight with Pettis. USADA has determined that the presence of clenbuterol in Moreno's system likely resulted from clenbuterol-contaminated meat that Moreno had consumed in Mexico, and so Moreno was not punished by USADA.

Moreno was expected to face Ray Borg on April 7, 2018, at UFC 223. However, the bout was canceled after Borg was injured by glass from a bus window that was smashed by Conor McGregor. The pairing was left intact and quickly rescheduled and was expected to take place on May 19, 2018, at UFC Fight Night 129. However, Borg withdrew from the bout to take care of his child from brain surgery, and was replaced by Alexandre Pantoja. Moreno lost the fight by unanimous decision. In an interview in 2019, Moreno revealed that he had been cut from the UFC in late 2018.

Post-UFC career
Moreno signed a multi-fight contract with the Legacy Fighting Alliance and made his promotional debut against the prevailing Flyweight Champion Maikel Perez at LFA 69 on June 7, 2019. Moreno won the fight via technical knockout in the fourth round.

UFC return
Moreno faced promotional newcomer Askar Askarov on September 21, 2019, at UFC Fight Night 159. The back-and-forth bout ended in a split draw.

Moreno faced Kai Kara-France on December 14, 2019, at UFC 245. He won the fight by unanimous decision.

Moreno faced Jussier Formiga on March 14, 2020, at UFC Fight Night 170. He won the fight via unanimous decision.

As the first bout of his new contract, Moreno was expected to face Alex Perez on November 21, 2020, at UFC 255. However, on October 2, it was announced that Cody Garbrandt, who was scheduled to fight Deiveson Figueiredo for the UFC Flyweight Championship at the event, pulled out due to a torn bicep and was replaced by Perez. Moreno instead faced Brandon Royval. He won the fight via technical knockout in round one.

UFC Flyweight Championship
Moreno faced Deiveson Figueiredo for the UFC Flyweight Championship on December 12, 2020, at UFC 256. After five rounds of frenetic back-and-forth fighting in which Figueiredo was deducted 1 point in the third round due to a groin strike, the bout was declared a majority draw. This fight earned both athletes the Fight of the Night award.

Moreno rematched Figueiredo for the UFC Flyweight Championship on June 12, 2021, co-headlining UFC 263. Moreno dominated the striking and grappling exchanges and submitted Figueiredo with a rear naked choke in the third round, becoming the first Mexican UFC champion in the process. This win earned him the Performance of the Night award.

The trilogy rematch with Figueiredo for the UFC Flyweight Championship was scheduled to take place on December 11, 2021, at UFC 269 initially, but was moved to UFC 270 as the co-main event. He lost the fight and the title via unanimous decision. This fight earned him the Fight of the Night award.

Post-Championship trilogy
Moreno next faced Kai Kara-France in a rematch for the interim UFC Flyweight Championship on July 30, 2022, at UFC 277. He won the fight via TKO in the third round. The win also earned Moreno his third Fight of the Night award. Moreno received Crypto.com "Fan Bonus of the Night" awards paid in bitcoin of US$20,000 for second place.

A fourth bout between Moreno and Deiveson Figueiredo for the undisputed UFC Flyweight Championship took place on January 21, 2023, at UFC 283, marking the first time in UFC history that two fighters fought each other for a fourth time. Moreno won the bout and undisputed title via technical knockout just before the fourth round after the ringside doctor stopped the fight due to Figueiredo's eye swelling shut.

Personal life
Moreno is a big fan of Funko Pop and is a dedicated Lego collector. He and his wife have three daughters. Also fluent in English, Moreno is an active member of the Spanish language mixed martial arts community, and hosts multiple podcasts in his native language.

Championships and accomplishments 
 Ultimate Fighting Championship
 UFC Flyweight Championship (Two times; current)
 Interim UFC Flyweight Championship (One time)
 Fight of the Night (Three times) 
 Performance of the Night (Three times) 
 First Mexican UFC champion
 World Fighting Federation
 WFF Flyweight Champion (One time)
 Legacy Fighting Alliance
 LFA Flyweight Championship (One time)
MMAjunkie.com
 2020 December Fight of the Month 
2021 June Submission of the Month 
2022 January Fight of the Month 
World MMA Awards
2021 Breakthrough Fighter of the Year
2021 Fight of the Year vs. Deiveson Figueiredo at UFC 256
2021 Fighting Spirit of the Year  for perseverance - from being cut, to fighting back and becoming the first Mexican UFC champion
Voting period for 2021 awards ran through July 2020 to July 2021 due to the COVID-19 pandemic.

Mixed martial arts record

|-
|Win
|align=center|21–6–2
|Deiveson Figueiredo
|TKO (doctor stoppage)
|UFC 283
|
|align=center|3
|align=center|5:00
|Rio de Janeiro, Brazil
|
|-
|Win
|align=center|20–6–2
|Kai Kara-France
|TKO (body kick and punches)
|UFC 277
|
|align=center|3
|align=center|4:34
|Dallas, Texas, United States
|
|-
|Loss
|align=center|19–6–2
|Deiveson Figueiredo
|Decision (unanimous)
|UFC 270
|
|align=center|5
|align=center|5:00
|Anaheim, California, United States
|
|-
|Win
|align=center|19–5–2
|Deiveson Figueiredo
|Submission (rear-naked choke)
|UFC 263
|
|align=center|3
|align=center|2:26
|Glendale, Arizona, United States
|
|-
|Draw
|align=center|18–5–2
|Deiveson Figueiredo
|Draw (majority)
|UFC 256
|
|align=center|5
|align=center|5:00
|Las Vegas, Nevada, United States
|
|-
|Win
|align=center|18–5–1
|Brandon Royval
|TKO (punches)
|UFC 255
|
|align=center|1
|align=center|4:59
|Las Vegas, Nevada, United States
|
|-
|Win
|align=center|17–5–1
|Jussier Formiga
|Decision (unanimous)
|UFC Fight Night: Lee vs. Oliveira 
|
|align=center|3
|align=center|5:00
|Brasília, Brazil
| 
|-
|Win
|align=center|16–5–1
|Kai Kara-France
|Decision (unanimous)
|UFC 245 
|
|align=center|3
|align=center|5:00
|Las Vegas, Nevada, United States
|   
|-
|Draw
|align=center|
|Askar Askarov
|Draw (split)
|UFC Fight Night: Rodríguez vs. Stephens 
|
|align=center|3
|align=center|5:00
|Mexico City, Mexico
|
|- 
|Win
|align=center|15–5
|Maikel Pérez
|TKO (punches)
|LFA 69
|
|align=center|4
|align=center|1:54
|Cabazon, California, United States
|
|-
|Loss
|align=center|14–5
|Alexandre Pantoja
|Decision (unanimous)
|UFC Fight Night: Maia vs. Usman
|
|align=center|3
|align=center|5:00
|Santiago, Chile
|
|-
|Loss
|align=center|14–4
|Sergio Pettis
|Decision (unanimous)
|UFC Fight Night: Pettis vs. Moreno
|
|align=center|5
|align=center|5:00
|Mexico City, Mexico
|
|-
|Win
|align=center|14–3
|Dustin Ortiz
|Technical Submission (rear-naked choke)
|UFC Fight Night: Swanson vs. Lobov
|
|align=center|2
|align=center|4:06
|Nashville, Tennessee, United States
|
|-
|Win
|align=center|13–3
|Ryan Benoit
|Decision (split)
|The Ultimate Fighter: Tournament of Champions Finale 
|
|align=center|3
|align=center|5:00
|Las Vegas, Nevada, United States
|
|-
| Win
| align=center|12–3
| Louis Smolka
| Submission (guillotine choke)
| UFC Fight Night: Lineker vs. Dodson
| 
| align=center| 1
| align=center| 2:23
| Portland, Oregon, United States
|
|-
| Win
| align=center| 11–3
| Isaac Camarillo
| Submission (rear-naked choke)
| World Fighting Federation 27
| 
| align=center| 1
| align=center| 1:53
| Tucson, Arizona, United States
|
|-
| Win
| align=center| 10–3
| Tyler Bialeck
| Submission (rear-naked choke)
| World Fighting Federation 22
| 
| align=center| 1
| align=center| 3:09
| Tucson, Arizona, United States
|
|-
| Win
| align=center| 9–3
| Matt Betzold
| Decision (unanimous)
| World Fighting Federation 18
| 
| align=center| 3
| align=center| 5:00
| Chandler, Arizona, United States
|
|-
| Win
| align=center| 8–3
| C.J. Soliven
| Submission (rear-naked choke)
| World Fighting Federation 16
| 
| align=center| 1
| align=center| 0:58
| Chandler, Arizona, United States
| 
|-
| Win
| align=center| 7–3
| Alex Contreras
| Submission (triangle choke)
| World Fighting Federation 14
| 
| align=center| 3
| align=center| 1:04
| Chandler, Arizona, United States
| 
|-
| Win
| align=center| 6–3
| Paul Amaro
| Submission (rear-naked choke)
| MEZ Sports: Pandemonium 9
| 
| align=center| 2
| align=center| 3:01
| Mission Viejo, California, United States
| 
|-
| Win
| align=center| 5–3
| Jason Carbajal
| TKO (punches)
| MEZ Sports: Pandemonium 8
| 
| align=center| 3
| align=center| 1:52
| Pomona, California, United States
| 
|-
| Win
| align=center| 4–3
| Jesse Cruz
| Decision (split)
| Xplode Fight Series: Anarchy
| 
| align=center| 3
| align=center| 3:00
| Valley Center, California, United States
|
|-
| Loss
| align=center| 3–3
| Brenson Hansen
| Decision (unanimous)
| CITC 11: Xtreme Couture vs. Southern California
| 
| align=center| 3
| align=center| 5:00
| Biloxi, Mississippi, United States
|
|-
| Win
| align=center| 3–2
| Jonathan Carter
| Submission (armbar)
| Xplode Fight Series: Hunted
| 
| align=center| 1
| align=center| 1:15
| Valley Center, California, United States
| 
|-
| Loss
| align=center| 2–2
| Ron Scolesdang
| Decision (unanimous)
| MEZ Sports: Pandemonium 6
| 
| align=center| 3
| align=center| 5:00
| Riverside, California, United States
|
|-
| Win
| align=center| 2–1
| Luis Garcia
| Submission (armbar)
| UWC Mexico: New Blood 1
| 
| align=center| 1
| align=center| 2:21
| Tijuana, Mexico
|
|-
| Loss
| align=center| 1–1
| Marco Beristain
| Decision (unanimous)
| UWC Mexico 10: To The Edge
| 
| align=center| 3
| align=center| 5:00
| Tijuana, Mexico
|
|-
| Win
| align=center| 1–0
| Atiq Jihad
| Submission (armbar)
| UWC Mexico 9.5: Iguana
| 
| align=center| 1
| align=center| 2:30
| Tijuana, Mexico
|
|-

Mixed martial arts exhibition record

|-
|Loss
|align=center|0–1
| Alexandre Pantoja
| Submission (rear-naked choke)
| The Ultimate Fighter: Tournament of Champions
| 
|align=center|2
|align=center|3:44
|Las Vegas, Nevada, United States
|

See also
List of current UFC fighters
List of male mixed martial artists

References

External links
 

1993 births
Mexican male mixed martial artists
Flyweight mixed martial artists
Mixed martial artists utilizing Brazilian jiu-jitsu
Living people
Mexican practitioners of Brazilian jiu-jitsu
Sportspeople from Tijuana
Ultimate Fighting Championship male fighters
Ultimate Fighting Championship champions